is a Japanese shōnen manga magazine published by ASCII Media Works (formerly MediaWorks) under the Dengeki brand. Many manga serialized in Dengeki Daioh were later published in tankōbon volumes under ASCII Media Works' Dengeki Comics imprint. The magazine is sold every month on the 27th. A yonkoma section of Dengeki Daioh called  features various omake strips of the manga series published in it. The format is typically a normal drawing on the right side featuring one or sometimes more characters, and a vertical four panel strip on the left featuring characters from the associated series in super deformed form. Two special editions of the magazine called Dengeki Moeoh and Dengeki Daioh Genesis are sold bimonthly and quarterly, respectively.

The publication originated from Bandai's Cyber Comix magazine, which later became the short-lived Media Comix Dyne — it lasted three issues. After the publication of Media Comix Dyne was canceled, MediaWorks launched Dengeki Daioh as a quarterly publication in 1994. It eventually developed into a bimonthly magazine in 1996, and later into a monthly publication when its name was changed to its current title, Monthly Comic Dengeki Daioh. In recent years, the magazine has taken to publishing information on anime and video games as well where half the magazine contains such information. Dengeki Daioh celebrated its thirteenth year of publication in 2007. Starting with the August 2008 issue, sold on June 27, 2008, Dengeki Daioh increased the number of manga series serialized in each issue which expanded the page count from about 700 to 900 pages per issue.


Serialized titles

In Dengeki Daioh

In Dengeki Moeoh
Dengeki!! Aegis 5
Haru no Chū
Koharubiyori
Maromayu (spinoff of Paniponi)
Nogizaka Haruka no Himitsu
Omakase! Sayana no Moerobu
Shōgakusei Sentai Petarikon
Tenshi no 3P! no 3P!!
Tōhō Kōrindō ~ Curiosities of Lotus Asia.
Yumemitari na Hoshimatari na
Yuriseijin Naoko-san
Megami-sama no ai ga guigui kuru
Hatsukoi, Tokimeki Usuihon

In Dengeki Teioh
Hamuchu
Iono-sama Fanatics
Koharubiyori
Kyōhaku Dog's
Jigoku Gokuraku Tempest
Lunch box
Mattari-san
Murder Princess
Scape-God
Shina Dark

Special editions

Dengeki Moeoh
 is a seinen manga magazine sold on the twenty-sixth of every other month; the magazine is a special edition version of Dengeki Daioh. It first went on sale on March 26, 2002, and was originally published quarterly. The magazine stopped publication with its sixteenth issue in December 2005 for three months. In March 2006, the magazine started to be published bimonthly. As of 2009, circulation was 50,000 copies.

Dengeki Teioh
 was a Japanese seinen manga magazine published by MediaWorks; the magazine was a special edition of Dengeki Daioh, which went on sale four times a year in January, April, July, and November on the twenty-sixth. The magazine was published between April 26, 2004 and November 26, 2006.

Comic Sylph
 was a quarterly shōjo manga magazine, and first went on sale on December 9, 2006, as a special edition version of Dengeki Comic Gao!, but starting with the sixth volume on March 21, 2008, Comic Sylph became a special edition version of Dengeki Daioh. Comic Sylph was one of the few magazines originally published by MediaWorks not under the Dengeki naming line, such as with Dengeki Daioh, and Dengeki G's Magazine, the first of which being Active Japan in 1995 which was discontinued in 1998. Starting with the issue published on May 22, 2008, the magazine's title changed to simply  and started to be published bimonthly as an independent magazine.

Dengeki Bunko Magazine
 is a seinen light novel magazine published bimonthly which originally began as a special edition of Dengeki Daioh. The magazine was first published on December 10, 2007, as the successor of Dengeki hp, but from the third issue on, published on April 10, 2008, the magazine became independent of Dengeki Daioh.

Dengeki Daioh "g"

Notes
 These manga were transferred from Dengeki Comic Gao!.
 This manga was transferred from Houbunsha's Manga Time Lovely.
 This manga was transferred from Comptiq.
 This manga was transferred from Manga Time Kirara.
 This manga was transferred from Dengeki Daiohs special edition Dengeki Teioh.
 This manga was transferred from Comic Blade.
 This manga was transferred to Ultra Jump.
 These manga are on hiatus.

References

External links
Dengeki Daioh's official website 
''Dengeki Moeoh'''s official website 

1994 establishments in Japan
 
Magazines established in 1994
Magazines published in Tokyo
Monthly manga magazines published in Japan
Shōnen manga magazines